Marion Rodewald (born 24 December 1976 in Mülheim an der Ruhr, North Rhine-Westphalia) is a field hockey defender from Germany, who won the gold medal with the German National Women's Team at the 2004 Summer Olympics in Athens, Greece.

International senior tournaments
 1996 – Indoor European Nations Cup, Glasgow (1st place)
 1997 – Champions Trophy, Berlin (2nd place)
 1998 – World Cup, Utrecht (3rd place)
 1999 – Champions Trophy, Brisbane (3rd place)
 1999 – European Nations Cup, Cologne (2nd place)
 2000 – Olympic Qualifying Tournament, Milon Keynes (3rd place)
 2000 – Champions Trophy, Amstelveen (2nd place)
 2000 – Summer Olympics, Sydney (7th place)
 2002 – World Cup, Perth (7th place)
 2003 – Champions Challenge, Catania (1st place)
 2003 – European Nations Cup, Barcelona (3rd place)
 2004 – Olympic Qualifier, Auckland (4th place)
 2004 – Summer Olympics, Athens (1st place)
 2004 – Champions Trophy, Rosario (2nd place)
 2005 – Champions Trophy, Canberra (5th place)
 2006 – World Cup, Madrid (8th place)
 2007 – European Nations Cup, Manchester (1st place)
 2008 – Champions Trophy, Mönchengladbach (2nd place)
 2008 – Summer Olympics, Beijing (4th place)

References
 Profile on Hockey Olympica
 Personal website

External links
 

1976 births
Living people
Sportspeople from Mülheim
German female field hockey players
Olympic field hockey players of Germany
Field hockey players at the 2000 Summer Olympics
Field hockey players at the 2004 Summer Olympics
Field hockey players at the 2008 Summer Olympics
Olympic gold medalists for Germany
Olympic medalists in field hockey
Medalists at the 2004 Summer Olympics
20th-century German women
21st-century German women